The 1917 municipal election was held December 10, 1917, to elect a mayor and seven aldermen to sit on Edmonton City Council and four trustees to sit on each of the public and separate school boards.  There were also two plebiscite questions asked.

There were ten aldermen on city council, but three of the positions were already filled: George Pheasey, William Martin, and Charles Grant were all elected to two-year terms in 1916 and were still in office.  Thomas Bellamy and James Macfie MacDonald were also elected to two-year terms in 1916, but both resigned to run for mayor; accordingly, the sixth most polular and seventh most popular candidates were elected to one year terms to finish off their terms --Samuel McCoppen and Henri Martin were elected to one-year terms. Kinney and McCoppen belonged to the Labour slate put forward by the Labour Representation League and were elected. The Labour slate was filled out by White, Field and Scott, all unsuccessful.

There were seven trustees on the public school board, but three of the positions were already filled: Joseph Duggan, C. Frost, and William Rea had all been elected to two-year terms in 1915.  The same was true of the separate board, where Joseph Gariépy, M. J. O'Farrell, and G. W. Curtis were all continuing.

The five mayoral candidates were the most in Edmonton's history up to that point.

The Southside was guaranteed to elect two members and as only two southsiders  - Orlando Bush and W.W. Prevey - were running, they were secured of victory. Their names were kept on the ballot anyway.

Hyman King announced that he would be running for an aldermanic seat but he withdrew his nomination before election day. 

There was no Business slate but at least two candidates had a relationship. Esdale published a list of women and men who endorsed his candidacy. The list included fellow candidate W.W. Prevey. As each voter could cast multiple votes, there was no direct competition between Esdale and Prevey.

Electoral System 
Mayor was elected through First-past-the-post voting.

Councillors were elected through Plurality block voting, with each voter allowed to cast as many as seven votes.

Voter turnout

There were 7895 ballots cast out of 11,271 eligible voters, for a voter turnout of 70.0%.

Results

 bold indicates elected
 italics indicate incumbent
 South Side indicates, where data is available, a representative for Edmonton's South Side, with a minimum South Side representation instituted after the city of Strathcona, south of the North Saskatchewan River, amalgamated into Edmonton on February 1, 1912.

Mayor

Aldermen
Labour  = Labour Representation League

Public school trustees

Separate (Catholic) school trustees

Plebiscites

References

Election History, City of Edmonton: Elections and Census Office

1917
1917 elections in Canada
1917 in Alberta